George Carter (10 May 1901 – 29 January 1994) was an English cricketer.  Carter was a right-handed batsman who bowled right-arm medium pace.  He was born in Stoke Newington, London.

Carter made his first-class debut for Essex in the 1921 County Championship against Nottinghamshire.  Carter played 6 County Championship matches for Essex in the 1921 season, the last of which coming against Kent in July.  In 1923, he played his final first-class fixture for the county, his first since 1921, against the touring West Indians.  In his 7 first-class matches, he scored 163 runs at a batting average of 16.30, with a high score of 44*.

He died at Siesta Key, Florida, United States on 29 January 1994.

References

External links
George Carter at Cricinfo
George Carter at CricketArchive

1901 births
1994 deaths
People from Stoke Newington
Cricketers from Greater London
English cricketers
Essex cricketers